Hafford Airport  is a registered aerodrome located  northwest of Hafford, Saskatchewan, Canada.

See also 
List of airports in Saskatchewan

References

Registered aerodromes in Saskatchewan
Redberry No. 435, Saskatchewan